United Nations Security Council resolution 926, adopted unanimously on 13 June 1994, after reaffirming Resolution 915 (1994), the Council commended the work of the United Nations Aouzou Strip Observer Group (UNASOG) and the co-operation of Libya and Chad and decided, with immediate effect, to terminate the UNASOG mission in the Aouzou Strip.

See also
 Case Concerning the Territorial Dispute (Libya v. Chad)
 Chadian–Libyan conflict
 Foreign relations of Libya
 List of United Nations Security Council Resolutions 901 to 1000 (1994–1995)

References

External links
 
Text of the Resolution at undocs.org

 0926
1994 in Libya
1994 in Chad
Chadian–Libyan War
 0926
 0926
June 1994 events